The term cut and sew is a manufacturing process used in the making of custom garments within the fashion industry. A whole piece of any type of fabric is first placed on a cutting table or ran through a cutting machine. A garment piece or shape is then cut out, which is next sent for sewing through the garment assembly.

The term is prevalent in the urban fashion industry, where designers can either have a design screenprinted on a pre-made garment, such as a t-shirt or hooded sweatshirt, or have the entire garment created from scratch.  In the latter case, the designer of the graphic also played a role in the creation of the garment itself. Cut and sew garments are generally of higher quality and price than a standard mass-produced item. Brands like A Bathing Ape, Diamond Supply Co., Marc Ecko and Kanati Clothing Company have 'cut and sew' lines, which are most commonly items like button up shirts and other higher end clothing items instead of items like t-shirts.

In the apparel manufacturing industry, "cut and sew" refers to cutting and sewing garments from purchased fabric, as distinct from knitting fabric and then cutting and sewing that knit fabric into garments.

The process of working with a cut and sew factory would start with sending them a tech pack and/or providing a sew-by sample. You will also need to provide fabric and any trimmings you wish to add to your garment. You then get a pre-production sample where you can make adjustments if needed or send through for production. The pros of working with a cut and sew factory is having more room for customization and creating your own unique garment.

References 

Fashion